The U.S. city of Birmingham, Alabama is the site of 66 high-rises, all of which stand taller than . The tower was also the tallest building in the U.S. state of Alabama until the completion of the RSA Battle House Tower in Mobile in 2007. Birmingham's second-tallest skyscraper, the Regions-Harbert Plaza, rises  and has stood as the second tallest structure in the city since its completion in 1989. Overall, five of the ten tallest buildings in Alabama are located in Birmingham.

Tallest buildings
This includes spires and architectural details but does not include antenna masts. An equal sign (=) following a rank indicates the same height between two or more buildings. The "Year" column indicates the year in which a building was completed.

References
General

Specific

External links
 Diagram of Birmingham skyscrapers on SkyscraperPage

Birmingham
Buildings in Birmingham
Tallest, Birmingham